NBC 60th Anniversary Celebration is an American television special that aired on NBC on May 12, 1986. The executive producer was Alexander H. Cohen and the writer and co-producer was Hildy Parks. The same team assembled such famous-faces TV specials as Night of 100 Stars. This celebration also marks the debut of the current peacock logo of NBC.

Summary
The opening scene was staged in the corridors of corporate headquarters at 30 Rockefeller Plaza, where many NBC stars like Bob Hope, Milton Berle, Barbara Eden, Doris Roberts and four of the Huxtable kids from The Cosby Show arrive on the eighth floor via an elevator. They enter just in time to witness a perky musical number featuring "peacock" dancers and NBC tour guides all singing and dancing an opening theme titled Hey, Did You Know? within the lobbies of the building. The program quickly gets to a parade of stars in which, as an unseen announcer bellows out their individual names, formally dressed performers appear from behind a curtain, smilingly walk toward the television camera, and disappear to a warm ovation of what appears to be canned applause.

The roster proceeds, alphabetically, from Steve Allen and Harry Anderson to Jane Wyatt and Robert Young. Heading the list of the significantly absent is the always judicious Bill Cosby, whose then-current show has been the main reason that NBC has that season become the top-rated network for the first time in its history.

The rest, for the most part, consists of clips from shows down through the years, loosely arranged around categories and themes. The main plot of the special features two of the child stars from The Cosby Show, Malcolm-Jamal Warner and Keshia Knight Pulliam, being given a tour of NBC's facilities in New York and in Burbank, California. Much hinges on the question of whether little Keshia will ever get to see Johnny Carson in person.

The entire special itself pays tribute to every one of NBC television themes from late-night to daytime programming, radio days, earlier entertainment, comedy, drama, sitcoms, specials, movies, sports, and news, just to name a few. In the end, Malcolm and Keshia meet up with Johnny Carson himself on a stage full of NBC's guest stars singing a closing version of the opening theme, Hey, Did You Know? As the camera pans outward to reveal all the stars on screen, a new, modified version of the NBC peacock logo is unveiled, this time with six feathers. This marks the debut of the "current" NBC logo (as well as the NBC Productions logo with the current logo).

Cast

Debbie Allen
Steve Allen
Fran Allison
Harry Anderson
Bea Arthur
Gene Barry
Milton Berle
Tempestt Bledsoe
Tom Brokaw
Pierce Brosnan
Raymond Burr
Red Buttons
Sid Caesar
Macdonald Carey
Johnny Carson
Nell Carter
John Chancellor
Connie Chung
Dick Clark
Robert Conrad
Robert Culp
Ted Danson
Don DeFore
Angie Dickinson
Hugh Downs
Barbara Eden
Ralph Edwards
Nanette Fabray
Kim Fields
Michael J. Fox
Arlene Francis
Soleil Moon Frye
Estelle Getty
Marla Gibbs
Melissa Gilbert
George Gobel
Lorne Greene
Bryant Gumbel
Deidre Hall
Valerie Harper
Julie Harris
David Hasselhoff
Ed Herlihy
Bob Hope
Don Johnson
Perry King
Jack Klugman
Keshia Knight Pulliam
Michael Landon
Hope Lange
Sabrina Le Beauf
Jerry Lester
Shari Lewis
Hal Linden
Norman Lloyd
Shelley Long
Gloria Loring
Peter Marshall
Dick Martin
Rue McClanahan
Ed McMahon
Mitch Miller
Edwin Newman
Donald O'Connor
Merlin Olsen
Jack Paar
Patti Page
Bert Parks
Jane Pauley
George Peppard
Rhea Perlman
Sarah Purcell
Charlotte Rae
John Ratzenberger
Gene Rayburn
Martha Raye
Carl Reiner
Alfonso Ribeiro
Joan Rivers
Doris Roberts
Dan Rowan
Pat Sajak
Ricky Schroder
Doc Severinsen
Paul Shaffer
Dinah Shore
Bob Smith
Robert Stack
Craig Stevens
Mary Stuart
Philip Michael Thomas
Daniel J. Travanti
Robert Vaughn
Malcolm-Jamal Warner
Betty White
Jonathan Winters
Jane Wyatt
Robert Young

References

External links
 

National Broadcasting Company
NBC original programming
1986 in American television
1980s American television specials